The Longines Symphonette was a pre-recorded classical music program broadcast nightly on many Mutual Broadcasting System stations from 1943 to 1949. It then moved to CBS where it was heard Sundays at 2 pm from 1949 to 1957.

Frank Knight was the program's announcer. The introductory theme was the final movement of Beethoven's 5th Symphony. The series was sponsored by the Longines-Wittnauer watch company. A spin-off program was The Wittnauer Choraliers which aired on CBS from March 13, 1949, to April 22, 1955.

Uses of the name
The Longines Symphonette Society was a record label that specialized in releasing classic radio programs and multiple-record boxed sets. Evolution Records, a popular music subsidiary, had a US hit single with "One Fine Morning" by Lighthouse in 1971. The Longines watch company sold its record business to Warner Music Group; reissues of the Longines recordings since the 1990s have been credited to the "Symphonette Society" and no longer have any reference to the watch company.

Longines Symphonette is also the trade name of some electronic devices, including transistor radios, televisions, and electronic calculators produced by Texas Instruments.

Longines Symphonette was referenced in the lyrics of "Birdhouse in Your Soul", the 1989 single by US alternative rock band They Might Be Giants.

References

1940s American radio programs
1950s American radio programs
1943 radio programme debuts
1957 radio programme endings
American music radio programs
CBS Radio programs
Classical music radio programs
Mutual Broadcasting System programs
Easy listening record labels
Easy listening music